Urgleptes leopaulini is a species of beetle in the family Cerambycidae. It was described by Touroult in 2004. Its range includes the Caribbean islands of Guadeloupe, Martinique, and Saint Lucia.

References

Urgleptes
Beetles described in 2004